Lisa Gorman is an Australian fashion designer. She established the women’s fashion label Gorman, developed the brand for 22 years, retiring as its creative director in 2021.

Early life 

Eldest of four daughters, Gorman grew up at the coastal town of Warrnambool in Victoria.
After graduating  in 1989 from St Ann's  College, an all-girls school in Warrnambool, she moved to Melbourne and studied nursing. Gorman worked part-time at Royal Melbourne Hospital for eight years.

Career 

Gorman began her career in fashion as a designer for the Melbourne bridal couturier Mariana Hardwick. In 1999, she launched her label, Gorman, with a collection titled ‘Less Than 12 Degrees’ at the now-defunct fat 52 boutique. By 2003, the label was stocked in 55 retailers in Australia and 15 in Japan. In 2004, she opened the first Gorman boutique in Prahran, Melbourne.

In 2010, Gorman part-sold her brand to the fashion conglomerate Factory X, citing that she wanted to remain focused on the designing and have assistance running the growing business. That year in an interview with the Sydney Morning Herald, Gorman stated that “it’s been a good move. Before the partnership, I was exhausted. But I love it again now. It’s like a new phase for me. I feel so much more in tune with the product again and excited, and it’s just so much more of a joy to go into work. I feel like a huge weight has been lifted."

By 2020, Gorman had over 40 stores across Australia, and by November 2021, over 50. By the mid-2010s, Gorman (the label) was considered one of the most "iconic" brands on the Australian fashion scene. Brooke Babington, curator at the Heide Museum of Modern Art, has stated that the brand’s “playful and inventive approaches to colour, pattern and form… are all part of Gorman’s distinct and recognisable design aesthetic”. The label has built a loyal fan base, who call themselves “Gormies”.

Brand collections 
The label is known for its collaborations with Australian and international artists as part of each seasonal collection. These artists include: Atelier Bingo, Mirka Mora, Miranda Skoczek, Monika Forsberg, Liz Payne, Dana Kinter, Elke Kramer, Miso, Rhys Lee, Rachel Castle, Ellie Malin and Alexander Kori Girard. The Gorman 2019 Mangkaja collection collaborated with Aboriginal artists Ngarralja Tommy May (2020 winner of the Telstra Award) and Sonia Kurarra from Fitzroy Crossing in Western Australia's far north.

At the 2015 Melbourne Art Fair, Gorman said, "having now undertaken creative projects with over 30 different artists and brands both locally and abroad, I've come to realise how the act of collaborating has been definitive in shaping the Gorman brand".

Lisa collaborated with 114 artists during her time managing and developing the Gorman brand.

Manufacturing processes 
In 2010, Gorman was called the “Queen of Green” because of her passion for sustainable fashion, use of organic fabrics and efforts to reduce packaging. In 2016, the label received some negative publicity after Factory X featured on Oxfam’s annual “Naughty List” for not disclosing its suppliers. In April that year, Gorman also attracted criticism when it received an “F” in the Baptist World Aid fashion report for choosing not to participate in the survey.

The brand responded with the statement “Gorman's decision not to publicly disclose the identity of its manufacturers is not “naughty”. (The) Gorman team have worked closely with their manufacturers on the development of techniques, trims and treatments that are key to Gorman's point-of-difference in the marketplace. We are currently not prepared to share the details of our manufacturers with our competitors”.

In subsequent years, Gorman has worked with charitable organisations which compile these lists and has received "B" grades.

Personal life 

Gorman lives in Fitzroy, Victoria with her husband Dean Angelucci and their two daughters.

References 

Year of birth missing (living people)
Living people
People from Warrnambool
Businesspeople from Melbourne
Australian fashion designers
Australian women fashion designers
Australian women company founders
Australian company founders